is a mountain located in the cities of Gujō and Takayama in Gifu Prefecture, Japan. The rain that falls on the mountain flows into three rivers: the Nagara River, the Shō River and the Kuzuryū River.

History
Taichō (泰澄, 682–April 20, 767) was the first person to climb Mount Dainichi in 717. From the peak of the mountain, hikers can pray to nearby Mount Haku.

In pre-modern Japan, Mount Dainichi formed part of the border between Mino, Hida and Echizen provinces. Originally located in the village of Itoshiro in Fukui Prefecture, it became part of Gifu Prefecture during the "Great Shōwa Mergers" in 1958. It was first part of the town of Shirotori, which was later merged into the city of Gujō.

External links
 Geographical Survey Institute Map

References

Dainichi